Lines of Fate is a 2003 Russian television series directed by Dmitry Meskhiev. The series consists of three separate stories about different people in Moscow whose paths become intertwined at one point in their lives.

For her performance in the series, Valentina Talyzina received the Golden Eagle Award as Best Television Actress in 2004.

Cast
Valentina Talyzina - Rosa Sergeevna
Sergei Garmash - Vershinin
Irina Rozanova - Katerina Vershinina
Konstantin Khabensky - Kostya
Natalia Surkova - fortune teller Jeanne
Tatiana Kolganova - Nastya
Leonid Gromov - Sergei Rudenko
Andrey Krasko - Azerbaijani Alik
Mikhail Porechenkov - Igor
Evgeny Dyatlov - Eduard Voskresensky
Arthur Waha - Alexey Suzdaltsev
Zoya Buryak - Olga Nikolayevna, wife of Andrei Shchurkov
Tatyana Tkach - producer of Bell
Oleksiy Gorbunov - cameraman Andrey Shurkov
Georgiy Pitskhelauri
Natalia Terekhova - Yulia Vershinina
Yuliya Shubareva
Marina Zasukhina - episode (credited as M. Zasokhina)
Pavel Badyrov

References

External links

2003 Russian television series debuts
2003 Russian television series endings
2000s Russian television series
Russian drama television series
Films directed by Dmitry Meskhiev
Russia-1 original programming